Scouting in Texas has a long history, from the 1910s to the present day, serving thousands of youth in programs that suit the environment in which they live. Scouting, also known as the Scout Movement, is a worldwide youth movement with the stated aim of supporting young people in their physical, mental and spiritual development, so that they may play constructive roles in society.

The Boy Scouts of America (BSA) provides Scouting for boys and girls in all programs. Texas is home to the BSA national headquarters, in Irving, Texas. The Boy Scouts of America in Texas are organized into 20 local councils.

Girl Scouts of the USA, organized into eight local councils, only serves girls.

History
Scouting in Texas unofficially dates to the publication of British lieutenant general Robert Baden-Powell's popular book, Scouting for Boys, in 1908.  Even before a national organization had been started, groups of boys began Scout activities in troops and small groups in 1908, 1909, and 1910. The claims of several troops to be the first organized in Texas, whether before or after the incorporation of the Boy Scouts of America on February 8, 1910, are difficult to verify. BSA archives do show that the thirty-seventh registered scoutmaster in the country was a Texan, Rev. George W. Sheafor, of Comanche, in 1910.

In February 1910, just days after the Boys Scouts of America was organized, Boy Scout Troop 114 was established in Floresville, Texas by Professor W.H. Butler. A reference to the Floresville Boy Scout Troop can be found in the edition of April 2, 1911 of The Galveston Daily News when they published a picture of the Floresville troop. An article in the Victoria, Weekly Advocate (probably January 10, 1911 edition) refers to the Floresville Boy Scout troop as the second oldest in Texas. A short break in the troop's charter occurred in 1974. They no longer appear to be an active Troop.

Austin, TX Troop 5 was formed in 1911 and has been in continuous operation since that time.  In 2011, Austin Troop 5 celebrated its 100th anniversary centennial at Camp Mabry.  Troop 5 is believed to be the oldest continuously chartered scout troop in Texas.

In 1913 Troop 7 was established in Grapevine, Texas.  The troop has been chartered every year since starting except 1979.

In 1916 Troop 1 was established in Wichita Falls, Texas. Troop 1 in Wichita Falls has been continuously chartered since 1916.

An African American troop was formed in Port Arthur as early as 1916. The BSA report to Congress for 1930 named Dallas as one of the southern cities in which Scouting was growing in the black community. Hispanic boys were also active in Scouting, often in units with non-Hispanic boys. Jewish youth had been active in Scouting in San Antonio for many years before a synagogue sponsored a troop for them in 1924.

By 1918, unofficial Wolf Cub packs appeared in Paris, Texas.

The BSA national office was moved to Irving in 1979.

The Girl Scouts of San Jacinto Council traces its roots back to the 1920s when Frances Mann Law and Corrinne Fonde organized a Girl Scout Council in Houston. The council office was in a three roomed cottage.

Most Girl Scouts of the USA units were originally segregated by race according to state and local laws and customs. The first troop for Mexican Americans was formed in Houston in 1922. In 1936, the first African American Girl Scout troop west of the Mississippi was formed in Texas.

The Girls Scouts' Camp Texlake was dedicated in 1949.

Boy Scouts of America in Texas

Texas is home to the BSA National Headquarters in Irving, Texas.  The National Scouting Museum was located in Irving from October 2002 until September 2017 when it was moved to Philmont Scout Ranch in Cimarron, New Mexico.

There are twenty Boy Scouts of America local councils in Texas. All of Texas lies within the Southern Region, except for El Paso, Hudspeth and Parmer Counties, which are part of Western Region.

Alamo Area Council

The Alamo Area Council, headquartered in San Antonio, Texas, serves a 13 county area in Texas.  The counties served by the Alamo Area BSA include Bexar, Atascosa, Bandera, Comal, Frio, Guadalupe, Karnes, Kendall, Kerr, La Salle, McMullen, Medina, and Wilson.

Organization
Districts
 Fiesta District
 River District
 Coyote District
 Roadrunner District
 Oak Tree District
 Mesquite District
 Wildflower District (meta-district includes Scoutreach)
 Prickly Pear District (meta-district includes Exploring)
 Mission District (made up of units run by The Church of Jesus Christ of Latter-day Saints, was dissolved at the end of 2019 when the Church dissolved all its scouting units)
The council is composed of:
Old Districts
 Texas Hills District
 Rough Rider District
 Diamondback District
 Summit District
 Memorial District
 Longhorn District
 Cimarron District
 Two Rivers District
 Armadillo District
 Victory District
 Broken Arrow District
 Cherokee District
 Eagle District
 El Dorado District
 Four Rivers District
 Galaxy District
 Keystone District
 Mission Tejas District
 Phoenix District
 Sioux District
 Aztec District
 Tomahawk District
 Two Feathers District 
These thirteen no longer have their old names, except Galaxy.

Camps
Alamo Area Council operates three camps: McGimsey Scout Park, where Cub Scout Day Camp is held during the summer, as well as other events throughout the year, Bear Creek Scout Reservation, where Boy Scout resident camp and Webelos resident camp are held during the summer, and the newest camp, the Mays Family Scout Ranch located south of downtown San Antonio.

Order of the Arrow
 Aina Topa Hutsi #60

Bay Area Council

Organization
 Coastal District 
 Cradle of Texas District
 Thunderbird District
 Northern Star District

Camps
 Camp Karankawa
 Sea Star Base Galveston

Order of the Arrow
 Wihinipa Hinsa Lodge

Buffalo Trail Council

The Buffalo Trail Council comprises five Districts serving West Texas.

Organization
 Chaparral District - Martin and Midland counties
 Comanche Trails District - Andrews, Ector, Loving, Ward, and Winkler counties
 Big Bend District - Brewster, Culberson, Jeff Davis, Presidio, and Reeves counties
 Lone Star District - Borden, Glasscock, Howard, Mitchell, Scurry and Sterling counties
 Scoutreach District

Camps
 Buffalo Trail Scout Ranch

Caddo Area Council

Headquartered in Texarkana, Texas, the Caddo Area Council (#584) serves Scouts in Northeast Texas and Arkansas.

The Longhorn District serves Bowie and Cass counties in Northeast Texas.

Capitol Area Council

The Capitol Area Council serves Scouts and Scouting volunteers in 15 Central Texas counties surrounding Austin.  The council currently (when?) serves 24,000 young people, and is led by the current Scout Executive, Jon Yates.

Organization

Camps
 Lost Pines Scout Reservation - Bastrop County, Texas
 Griffith League Scout Ranch - Bastrop County, Texas
 Camp Alma McHenry - near Giddings, Texas
 Camp Green Dickson - near Gonzales, Texas
 Smilin V -- Liberty Hill (Williamson County), Texas
 Roy D. Rivers Wilderness Camp - Near Smithville, Texas

Order of the Arrow
 Tonkawa #99
First chartered by the National Council on January 20, 1937, by Joe Lindsay Jr. and Joe Lindsay Sr., Tonkawa Lodge #99 started as Tejas Lodge but was later changed to Tonkawa in 1938 with lodge 72 already having the name. Tonkawa Lodge #99 was proudly had one of its members become the Order of the Arrow National Chief in 2011, Jonathan "Bunker" Hillis. Currently Tonkawa Lodge #99 has 12 Chapters that are aligned and named with the above-mentioned Districts.

Circle Ten Council
Lamar County, Texas
The Circle Ten Council serves BSA units in North Texas and a portion of Oklahoma.  Its service area encompasses all or parts of Collin, Dallas, Ellis, Fannin, Grayson, Henderson, Hunt, Kaufman, Lamar, Navarro, Rains, Rockwall and Van Zandt Counties in Texas as well as Bryan County in Oklahoma.  Founded in 1913 and based in Dallas, approximately 50,000 youth and 15,000 adults participate in Scouting through the council each year.

The council has four camps - Camp Wisdom, Camp James Ray, Clements Scout Ranch / Camp Trevor Rees-Jones and Camp Constantin / Jack D. Furst Aquatics Base. The Order of the Arrow is represented by Mikanakawa Lodge.

Conquistador Council 

The Conquistador Council (No. 413), with its office in Roswell, New Mexico, primarily oversees BSA units in southeast New Mexico.  However, Parmer County, Texas is included in the council territory because of its proximity to Clovis, New Mexico.  There are no units chartered in Parmer County. The area is part of El Llano Grande District.  The Kwahadi Lodge #78 of the Order of the Arrow serves local Arrowmen.

East Texas Area Council

The East Texas Area Council was formed in 1930 through the merger of the Davey Crockett Council, the Pine Tree Area Council, and the Tejas Council. It serves 17 counties in Texas.

Organization
 Five Rivers District
 Golden Eagle District
 Tomahawk District
 Wo Ha Li District

Camps
 George W. Pirtle Scout Reservation (Camp Pirtle)

Order of the Arrow
  Tejas Lodge 72

Golden Spread Council

The Golden Spread Council (#562) serves Scouts in the Panhandles of Texas and Oklahoma.  Its service area includes all or part of 23 counties in Texas and three counties in Oklahoma.

Organization

 Adobe Walls District
 Golden Eagle District
 Lone Wolf District
 Quanah Parker District

Camps

 Camp Don Harrington
 Camp M.K. Brown

Order of the Arrow

 Nischa Achowalogen

Longhorn Council

The Longhorn Council  serves Scouts in a 23 county area of North Texas and Central Texas.  Its headquarters is in Hurst (near Fort Worth), with an additional service center in Waco.

Organization
The council is organized into 20 districts:
 Aguila District, serving Soccer and Scouting units in Fort Worth
 , serving Young, Hood, Jack, and Palo Pinto Counties, and most of Parker County (except for Azle and Azle ISD).
 , serving Falls, Milam, and Robertson Counties, and most of Bell County (except Killeen ISD and Florence ISD)
 Comanche Trails District, serving Freestone, Limestone, and Leon Counties
 
 
 , serving McLennan County
 
 , serving Coryell County and Killeen ISD and Florence ISD in Bell County
 
 Orion District
 
 Santa Fe District
 
 
 Three Rivers District, serving Bosque, Hamilton, and Hill Counties
 , serving Tarrant County
 
 Woodbine District

Camps
 Worth Ranch (Palo Pinto, Texas)
 Sid Richardson Scout Ranch (Bridgeport, Texas)
 Camp Tahuaya (Belton, Texas)
 Hills and Hollows (Denton, Texas)
 Camp Shuler (Lake Whitney, Texas)

Order of the Arrow
  Netopalis Sipo Schipinahck Lodge #209

NeTseO Trails Council

NeTseO Trails Council serves Scouts in northeastern Texas (neT) and southeastern Oklahoma (seO) and has the Council Office in Paris, Texas on the west side of Loop 286.  Council merged with Circle Ten 3/1/2017.

Organization
 Two Rivers District
 Northern Star District
 White Oak District

Camps
 Camp Frederick H. Dierks, Wright City, Oklahoma (sold 2017)
 Lynwood Hogue Scout Camp a.k.a. "Hogue's Landing", Paris, TX

Order of the Arrow
 Loquanne Allangwh Lodge #428

Northwest Texas Council

The Northwest Texas Council (#587) was founded in 1920.  Based in Wichita Falls, the Northwest Texas Council serves almost 100 units in 12 Texas counties (Archer, Baylor, Clay, Cottle, Foard, Hardeman, King, Knox, Montague, Throckmorton, Wichita, and Wilbarger).

Organization

The Northwest Texas Council has two districts:

 Green Belt District
 Red River District

Camps
 Camp Perkins - a gift in 1941 from Mr. & Mrs. J. J. Perkins, is the primary camp for the council. It is about  located along the Red River.

Order of the Arrow
 Wichita Lodge 35

Rio Grande Council

The Rio Grande Council (#775) was formed in 1927 as the Lower Rio Grande Valley Council (#775). It changed its name in 1947 to the current name. It covers 5 counties, including Cameron, Hidalgo, Willacy, Starr & Zapata and it serves a membership of approximately, 4,000 youth and 1,500 adult leaders in the southernmost parts of Texas.

Organization
The Rio Grande Council has four districts:
 Arrowhead District
 Tip-O-Tex District
 Arroyo District
 Rio Bravo District

Camps
 Laguna Station High Adventure Sea Base is located on South Padre Island. Campers can gain SCUBA certification.
 Camp Perry was established in 1927 and has continuously operated as a Boy Scout Camp longer than any other such camp in Texas. There are twelve campsites at Camp Perry.

Order of the Arrow
 Wewanoma Lodge

Sam Houston Area Council

The Sam Houston Area Council serves youth in 16 counties in southeast Texas. The council headquarters is in Houston.

Organization
Central Division
 
 
 
 

East Division
 
 
 
 

Frontier Division
 
 
 
 

North Division
 
 
 
 
 

South Division
 
 
 
 
 

West Division
 
 
 
 

Learning for Life Division

Camps
 Camp Strake was a Boy Scout Camp in Southern Montgomery County, Texas off of I-45. The camp closed in December 2014. Camp Strake is moving to a rural site in the Sam Houston National Forest, between New Waverly and Coldspring near the community of Evergreen in order to create a 21st-century Scouting experience for Scouts and their leaders.
 El Rancho Cima Scout Reservation, a 2,680 acre mountain ranch purchased in 1953.  It is located on the Blanco River near Wimberley, Texas in the Devil's Backbone of the Texas Hill Country. El Rancho Cima contains three main areas. - 
 Due to devastating flooding at El Rancho Cima's River Camp on Memorial Day 2015, El Rancho Cima was closed as a scout camp.  Hays County purchased a portion of the land from SHAC in November 2019.
 Camp Brosig is located seven miles north of Sealy, Texas. This camp is used primarily for weekend camping at district/council activities. 
 Bovay Scout Ranch is located off SH 6, just south of Navasota, Texas. Bovay Scout Ranch contains the McNair Cub Adventure Camp and the Tellepsen Scout Camp.

OA Lodges
 Colonneh Lodge #137

International exchanges
Houston Scouts have an international relationship with Scouts in Chiba, Japan.

South Plains Council

The South Plains Council (#694) serves the area around Lubbock.

South Texas Council

The South Texas Council of Corpus Christi, Texas, was renamed from the Gulf Coast Council in 2003.

Organization
 Aztec District
 Brush Country District
 Coastal Plains District
 LaSalle District
 Pawnee District
 Venado District

Camps
 Camp Karankawa
 Camp Huisache

Order of the Arrow
 Karankawa Lodge 307

Texas Southwest Council

The Texas Southwest Council serves Scouts in Southwest Central Texas through the jurisdiction of two districts and 26 Boy Scout troops.

Organization
 Concho Valley District
 Amistad District

Camps
 Camp Sol Mayer
 Camp Fawcett
 Baden Powell Park

Order of the Arrow
Wahinkto Lodge 199

2022 Lodge Chief-Madison Schwab

Texas Trails Council

The Texas Trails Council was formed in 2003 by the consolidation of the Chisholm Trail Council (all of Taylor, Shackelford, Haskell, Jones, Callahan, and Coleman counties, and part of Runnels County) and the Comanche Trail Council (Brown, Comanche, Erath, Mills, San Saba, and Lampasas counties).

Organization
 Old Comanche Trails District (Stephens, Erath, Eastland, and Comanche counties, along with Moran ISD and Cross Plains ISD)
 Pecan Valley District (Lampasas, San Saba, Brown, Mills, and Coleman counties)
 Buffalo Mountain District (Stonewall, Fisher, Haskell, Jones, Nolan, and Taylor counties, along with Albany ISD, Baird ISD, Clyde ISD, and Winters ISD)

Camps
 Camp Billy Gibbons
 Camp Tonkawa

Order of the Arrow
 Penateka Lodge

Three Rivers Council

Organization
 Big Thicket District
 Sabine District
 Spindletop District
 Trinity District

Camps
Scott Scout Ranch formerly Camp Urland
 Camp Urland Scout Reservation

Order of the Arrow
 Hasinai Lodge

Neche Lodge 36, Second Oldest in the South until 1970 when the merger of Trinity Neches and Sabine Area required a combine lodge name change to Hasinai.

Yucca Council

Yucca Council serves Scouts in Texas and New Mexico in the El Paso area.

Organization
 Geronimo District
 Mescalero District
 Polaris District
 Sunshine District
 Wapaha District
 White Sands District

Camps
 Black Range Cavalcade
 Camp Dale Resler

Order of the Arrow
 Gila Lodge

As the Boy Scouts of America has trademarked the phrase, "Scouting," there are no other organizations in the state who may use the term in reference to its program for boys.

Girl Scouts of the USA in Texas

There are 8 Girl Scout councils in Texas.

Girl Scouts of Central Texas

Girl Scouts of Central Texas (GSCTX) serves 46 counties and includes the former councils of: Girl Scouts — Bluebonnet Council, Girl Scouts — El Camino Council, Girl Scouts — Heart of Texas Council, Girl Scouts — Lone Star Council. In 2017, the Girl Scouts of Central Texas served 17,000 girls, ages 5–17 years, and over 12,000 adult volunteers in 46 counties. The council runs two residential camps: Camp Texlake and Camp Kachina.

Camps
Camp Texlake comprises  on Lake Travis. It was assigned to the former Girl Scouts — Lone Star Council by the Lower Colorado River Authority, and was dedicated on July 17, 1949. That summer nearly 400 girls attended camp. The dining facility overlooks Lake Travis itself. The council houses ten horses at this site as well as encouraging watersports. The camp can accommodate 335 overnight guests in a variety of situations.

Camp Kachina is on the shores of Lake Belton. Activities include archery, sailing, and water sports.

GSCTX serves girls with programming that is fun, high-quality, relevant, innovative, and meaningful. Program areas include STEM, Financial Literacy, Bullying Prevention, Outdoors, Travel, and many special interest troops such as Outdoor Adventure, Robotics, Harp Ensemble, and Mariners.

Girl Scouts of the Desert Southwest – Southern New Mexico & West Texas 

Girl Scouts of the Desert Southwest brings together Girl Scouts of the Permian Basin, Girl Scouts of the Rio Grande and Girl Scouts - Zia Council. The merger on May 1, 2009, is part of the realignment of Girl Scout councils nationwide.(see Scouting in New Mexico).

Organization
Service Centers:
Midland, TX;
Odessa, TX;
Alamogordo, NM;
Artesia, NM;
Carlsbad, NM;
Deming, NM;
Hobbs, NM;
Las Cruces, NM;
Roswell, NM;
Silver City, NM;

Camps
Camp Mitre Peak is located in the Davis Mountains between Alpine and Fort Davis. There are three cabins, known as Kickapoo, Apache, and Seminole, located in Fern Canyon. There are also three tent units: Mescalero, Tonkawa, and Chippewa. These have views of Mitre Peak. The Janice Hill Mathews Amphitheater seats over 200 people and campfires are held here. The Pamela Catherine Haas Horseback Riding Arena, nicknamed Rebel Arena, gives girls the opportunity to participate in western riding and trail riding programs. The Laura Van Pelt Complex supports indoor activities. The complex consists of a pavilion and an educational building. The latter includes a kitchen and a darkroom. Alumni and supporters of the camp can join Troop Mitre.

Camps:
 Camp Pioneer in Sunland Park, NM
 Camp Mitre Peak in Fort Davis, TX

Girl Scouts - Diamonds of Arkansas, Oklahoma and Texas

Headquarters: North Little Rock, Arkansas

Girl Scouts of Greater South Texas

Formed by the merger of Girl Scouts Paisano Council and Girl Scouts — Tip of Texas Council in 2007.

Organization
Council Offices:
 Corpus Christi, TX
 McAllen, TX

Program Centers:
 Laredo, TX
 Victoria, TX

Camps
 Camp Bayview is  near Bayview, TX along the Resaca de los Cuates. There are cabins and bungalows to accommodate campers. There is a swimming pool, amphitheater and a covered pavilion.
 Camp Green Hill is spread over almost  and is located near Mathis, TX on Lake Corpus Christi. The site is mostly wooded. Small craft can be launched from the waterfront.

Girl Scouts of Northeast Texas 

The Dallas Girl Scouts were established in December 1920 through the joint efforts of Mr. Elmer Scott and members of the Business and Professional Women's Club. In 1963, the Dallas Girl Scouts merged with the Chisholm Trail Girl Scout Council and began serving 11 counties as the Tejas Girl Scout Council. In 2007, Girl Scouts of Northeast Texas was born through the merger of Cross Timbers, Red River Valley, and Tejas Councils.

GSNETX's other programs include Girl Scout Academy, Girl Scouts Direct, Girl Scout Leadership Institute, and Las Mariposas.

Council
Spanning 23,000 square miles, Girl Scouts of Northeast Texas serves nearly 25,000 girls and 12,500 adults in 32 northeast Texas counties: Anderson, Camp, Cherokee, Collin, Dallas, Delta, Denton, Ellis, Fannin, Franklin, Freestone, Grayson, Gregg, Harrison, Henderson, Hopkins, Hunt, Kaufman, Lamar, Marion, Morris, Navarro, Panola, Rains, Red River, Rockwall, Rusk, Smith, Titus, Upshur, Van Zandt and Wood.

Mission: Girl Scouting builds girls of courage, confidence, and character, who make the world a better place.

Vision: To be the best organization to help girls thrive in the 21st century.

Value Proposition: Girl Scouts is the only organization that prepares every G.I.R.L. to practice a lifetime of leadership, by providing access to countless girl-led experiences, skill-building opportunities, and connections, because girls built of courage, confidence, and character make the world a better place.

Service Centers
There are a total of 8 service centers: Jo Ann Fogg (Headquarters), Collin Service Area Service Center, Denton Service Center, East Texas Service Center, Grayson Service Center, Highland Village Service Center, Paris Service Center, and Southern Sector Service Center.

Camps
 Camp Bette Perot - A resident summer camp near Palestine, Texas where campers to live in a cabin, lodge, or platform tent. Camp activities include swimming in a sparkling pool, partaking in challenging ropes courses, and participating in Bette Perot's most notable program: their equestrian program.
 Camp Rocky Point - A resident summer camp on Lake Texoma founded in 1952, with a scenic waterfront view where campers can go kayaking, canoeing, and swimming.
 STEM Center of Excellence -  at Camp Whispering Cedars is located 20 minutes from downtown Dallas, TX with several facilities accommodating STEM based activities. Campers are also able to go swimming in the pool, go hiking, and shoot arrows in archery.
 Camp Kadohadacho - 150 acre area on Lake Texoma where the campers get to pitch their own tent. Includes an on-sit bath house, fire circle, and amphitheater.
 Camp Gambill -  near Paris, Texas. Initial bit donated in 1947 by John C. Gambill. This camp offers sailing, archery, kayaking, sand volleyball, hiking, and playing a round of Goosey Golf.

Awards
 Tech Titans Technology Advocate Award Finalist- 2017
 Dallas Business Journal Real Estate Award-2017 Most Creative Financing STEM Center of Excellence
 AXIS Awards Knowledge Management Finalist GSNETX Learning Channel

Girl Scouts of San Jacinto Council

Girl Scouts of San Jacinto Council was founded by Mrs. F. M. Law and Miss Corinne Fonde in 1922 in Houston.

Girl Scouts of San Jacinto Council serves 26 counties in Southeast Texas, including Angelina, Brazoria, Chambers, Fort Bend, Galveston, Hardin, Harris, Houston, Jasper, Jefferson, Liberty, Matagorda, Montgomery, Nacogdoches, Newton, Orange, Polk, Sabine, San Augustine, San Jacinto, Shelby, Trinity, Tyler, Walker, Waller, and Wharton.

Program Place and Goodykoontz Museum of Girl Scout History

The Program Place and Goodykoontz Museum of Girl Scout History opened in 2007. It is situated next to the headquarters building and is intended to function in harmony with the headquarters on the shared site. The Program Place includes a library, theater, Girl Scout shop, stage, café and a lounge for older girls, as well as a park with fire pit. The Goodykoontz Museum of Girl Scout History, in the same building, features a timeline from the start of the council in the 1920s until the present, and interactive displays. The building acquisition and renovation cost $5.6 million. The entrance canopy of the Program Place was designed and built by University of Houston graduate architecture students. The pavilion was represents a Girl Scout sash.

Camps

There are ten camps run by the council. Three of these form the Treelake Complex, a series of connected camps. Trails allow Girl Scouts to hike from Camp Misty Meadows to Camp Silver Springs via Camp Agnes Arnold.

Camp Agnes Arnold is a  camp near Conroe. Campers can be accommodated in tents, yurts, tree houses or cabin units. The camp offers canoeing and fishing on Shadow Lake. A nature trail encircles the lake. The Ann Temple Allen Lodge is air-conditioned. The Nature Center was opened on 2008-04-12. A glass wall makes an indoor observation deck. There is also a pillared observation deck. Wood from around the site was used to build the center. The council received the 2008 Excellence in Wood Design Award from the Texas Forestry Association (TFA) for the Nature Center. The Ann Temple Allen Lodge is air-conditioned.

It is only operational during the daytime.

Camp Casa Mare is a year-round camping facility for Girl Scouts ages 8–17 years old. It is located on Galveston Bay in Seabrook, Texas and under ownership of the Girl Scouts San Jacinto Council. Camp Casa Mare was founded in 1958 and has offered sailing programs, aquatics, and sporting activities, not to mention performing arts and academic classes. Fencing is also offered to campers at this site.

The Galveston Boat Club (GBC) is a two-storey building on Galveston Island. Visitors sleep on the floor on the second storey. Adult leaders can be accommodated in a separate small building. The GBC is in a residential area. Visitors primarily use the GBC to visit the island's attractions.

Camp Misty Meadows is a  wooded camp located in Conroe. The main attraction of this camp is its horse riding facilities. In 2007, there was a herd of forty horses. Visitors sleep in cabins or dormitories.

Camp Myra S. Pryor includes air-conditioned cabins and a camping area. The activity center is also air-conditioned.

Camp Robinwood is a  camp in Willis. Campers are accommodated in platform tents, cabins or dorms. Swimming and canoeing is conducted on Lake Ann, a man-made reservoir donated to the camp by a family whose daughter, a Brownie Scout named Ann Winchell, died at age nine. There is also an outdoor swimming pool.

Camp Silver Springs is a wooded  camp located in Conroe.

Camp Whispering Pines is a  site located in Garrison. Swimming, canoeing and rope assisted hill climbing are all on offer at this site.

Camp Wind-A-Mere is located in Alvin. The Tejas unit had two teepees. These were destroyed in Hurricane Ike, but will be replaced. The Caddo unit has platform tents. Pine Meadows and the Chickasaw site are camping areas. During Hurricane Ike, a great oak tree fell on the lodge and half the building was declared unsafe and unrepairable.

Girl Scouts of Southwest Texas 

Girl Scouts of Southwest Texas serves more than 19,000 girls and was established in 2007 from the San Antonio Area council plus a large section of the old El Camino council.

Organization
Counties served:
Atascosa, Bandera, Bexar, Frio, Kendall, Kerr, Medina, and Wilson from the San Antonio Area jurisdiction, Edwards, Dimmit, Kimble, Kinney, Maverick, Real, Uvalde, Val Verde, and Zavala from El Camino Council jurisdiction,  Comal, Gonzales, and Guadalupe from Lone Star Council jurisdiction, and Karnes from Tip of Texas Council, now Girl Scouts of Greater South Texas jurisdiction.

Service Centers:
 Avenida Guadalupe Girl Scout Center in San Antonio, TX

Camps
The land for it was donated in 1946 by the John F. Camp family. Campers sleep in cabins. An equestrian program is offered at this camp. La Jita means precious possession.
 Camp Mira Sol is  overlooking the Guadalupe River and is near Waring, TX.

Houses:
 Del Ro Girl Scout House in Val Verde county.
 Eagle Pass Girl Scout Educational Center in Maverick county
 Kerrville Girl Scout House in Kerr county
 New Braunfels Girl Scout Hous in Comal county
 Seguin Girl Scout House in Guadalupe county
 Uvalde Girl Scout House in Uvalde county

Girl Scouts of Texas Oklahoma Plains

Girl Scouts of Texas Oklahoma Plains serves over 24,000 girls and 9,000 adult volunteers. It was formed by the merger in January 2008 of Girl Scouts of Caprock Council, Girl Scouts-Five Star Council, Girl Scouts Norcentex Council, and Girl Scouts Circle T Council. The first Girl Scout troop in Fort Worth was formed in 1924.

Organization
Regional Offices:
 Abilene, TX
 Amarillo, TX
 Lubbock, TX
 Wichita Falls, TX
 Southlake, TX
Service Centers:

 Plainview, TX

Camps
 Camp Kiwanis
 Camp Rio Blanco
 Camp Timberlake
 Stevens Ranch
 Camp Mel Davis
 Camp Boothe Oaks

Scouting museums in Texas
 Fred H. Poppe Museum, Amarillo, Texas
 Goodykoontz Museum of Girl Scout History, Houston, Texas
 National Scouting Museum, Irving, Texas
 Worth Ranch Museum, Palo Pinto, Texas
 Harbin Scouting Museum at Camp Wisdom, Dallas, Texas

Further reading

See also
 Alfred Michael "Chief" Venne
 Asociación de Scouts de México, A.C.
 Roy Williams (Scouting)

External links

References

Texas
Youth organizations based in Texas
Southern Region (Boy Scouts of America)